Holywell is a hamlet located in the Central Bedfordshire district of Bedfordshire, England.

The settlement is close to Whipsnade and Studham, and Holywell forms part of the Studham civil parish (where the 2011 Census population was included). Holywell is also located close to the county border with Hertfordshire.

Hamlets in Bedfordshire
Central Bedfordshire District